Nippotaeniidea is a monotypic order of Cestoda (tapeworms). Members of this order are gut parasites of vertebrates.

References

Cestoda
Platyhelminthes orders